Anselm Aniagboso Ofodile, Jr. (born October 9, 1973) is a former American football tight end in the National Football League for the Baltimore Ravens, originally drafted by the Buffalo Bills.  He played college football at University of Missouri. He is now the head football coach of Festus High School in Festus, Missouri.

References

External links
Memphis Maniax profile
NFL and WLAF stats

1973 births
Living people
American football tight ends
Baltimore Ravens players
Buffalo Bills players
Cass Technical High School alumni
Memphis Maniax players
Missouri Tigers football players
Sportspeople from Columbia, Missouri
Rhein Fire players
Players of American football from Detroit
Pittsburgh Steelers players